Jun Group is a mobile advertising company founded in December 2005 by Mitchell Reichgut. The company focuses on distributing video and branded content in-app through a practice that is called value-exchange advertising. The company is based in New York, with offices in Chicago, Los Angeles, and Boston.

Jun Group uses data to create custom audiences for Fortune 500 advertisers. And its mobile SDK (software development kit) technology provides direct access to more than 100 million people. Jun Group can connect clients directly to consumers across devices via full-screen video, rich media, display, email, and value exchange ads.

History 
In January 2014, Jun Group received $2.5 million USD in debt financing from Western Technology Investment.

In 2015, Jun Group raised $28M in its first venture round — from investors including Halyard Capital and Bridge Bank. Halyard's Robert Nolan, Jr., Bruce Eatroff and Brendyn Grimaldi have all joined the company's board of directors.

In September 2018, Jun Group was acquired by Advantage Solutions. In September 2019, Corey Weiner became CEO of the company.

References

External links

Advertising agencies based in New York City